Beit Lid is a Palestinian town in the Tulkarm Governorate in the northeastern West Bank, located a 10 kilometers southeast of Tulkarm and west of Nablus. According to the Palestinian Central Bureau of Statistics, the town had a population of 4,994 inhabitants in 2007. In 1922, it had 653 inhabitants, which rose to 1,807 in 1961.

History
Byzantine ceramics have been found here.

The village mosque has a large gate with a triple arch. An inscription over the lintel is a construction text, commemorating the building of the mosque. It dates from the late  Mamluk, or early Ottoman period.

Ottoman era
Beit Lid, like all of Palestine was incorporated into the Ottoman Empire in 1517.  In the 1596  tax registers,  it was part of the nahiya ("subdistrict") of Jabal Sami, part of the larger Sanjak of Nablus. It had a population of 64 households, all Muslims. The inhabitants paid a fixed tax rate of 33,3% on agricultural products, including wheat, barley, summer crops, olive trees,  goats and beehives, in addition to occasional revenues and a press for olive oil or grape syrup; a total of 17,310  akçe. Half of the revenues went to a Waqf.

In 1838, Edward Robinson passed it in the distance, and placed  it in the  Wady esh-Sha'ir administrative region, west of Nablus. In 1863 Victor Guérin noted it as a  considerable village which occupied the top of a high hill; containing a thousand inhabitants. The houses were crudely built.

In 1882, the PEF's Survey of Western Palestine (SWP)  described Beit Lid as “A village of small size, built on a hill rising 600 feet above the valley south of it. The houses are of stone, and supplied by a well on the south-east, lower down. A few olives grow round the village.”

British Mandate era
In the 1922 census of Palestine conducted by the British Mandate authorities, Beit Lid's  population was 653, all Muslims, increasing in  the 1931 census  to 738 residents, still all Muslim, in a total of 171 houses.

In  the 1945 statistics the population of Beit Lid   was 960 Muslims,  and the land area was  16,752  dunams,  according to an official land and population survey. 1,044 dunams were for citrus and bananas, 3,264 dunams were plantations and irrigable land, 4,473 used for cereals, while 22 dunams were built-up (urban) land.

1948-1967
In the wake of the 1948 Arab–Israeli War, and after the 1949 Armistice Agreements, Beit Lid  came under Jordanian rule.

In 1961, the population of Beit Lid was  1,807.

Post-1967
After the Six-Day War in 1967, Beit Lid  has been under Israeli occupation.

Economy
Agriculture is a major economic sector in Beit Lid, with olives, almonds, figs, grapes and grains being the primary crops grown on 16,753 dunams. Until recently, agriculture employed most of the working males of the town, however, many residents are employed in small business professions, such as construction, blacksmithing and electricity. Many in Beit Lid that worked inside Israel, have been unemployed since the Second Intifada and the difficult conditions surrounding it.

There are four schools (two primary and two secondary), four kindergartens, a clinic operated by the Palestinian National Authority and founded in 1964. Beit Lid contains four mosques, including Masjid al-Qadim, Masjid Fatima Zahra, Masjid as-Salaam and Masjid Salah ad-Din.

See also 
 Beit Lid suicide bombing (January 1995)

References

Bibliography

External links
Welcome To Bayt Lid
Beit Lid, Welcome to Palestine
Survey of Western Palestine, Map 11:    IAA, Wikimedia commons

Tulkarm Governorate
Towns in the West Bank
Municipalities of the State of Palestine